Chicago Confidential is a 1957 American crime film noir directed by Sidney Salkow, starring Brian Keith, Beverly Garland and Dick Foran. It is based on the 1950 book Chicago: Confidential! by Jack Lait and Lee Mortimer.

Chicago Confidential was the first film produced for Edward Small by Robert E. Kent, who had been a writer and story supervisor at Columbia. Small and Kent went on to make many movies together.

Plot
A union official named Blane is framed for the murder of another union official. The crime syndicate actually responsible for the killing is free to continue its activities. District Attorney Jim Fremont's plan to run for governor can be helped by a conviction of Blane, but thanks to Blane's fiancée Laura Barton he begins to suspect that Blane has been set up, launching a new investigation.

Laura testifies in court that Blane was with her at the time of the murder, and a neighbor, Sylvia Clarkson, swears she heard Blane's voice there. Jim discovers a tape recording that suggests Clarkson might have been fooled, but Laura convinces him otherwise. Clarkson turns out to be conspiring with the criminals.

Racketeers knock Jim cold and take Laura hostage, led by Ken Harrison, who intends to flee by airplane.  Jim and his men surround the plane at the air strip and a gun battle ensues, Harrison being shot. Jim's political future is now set, while Blane is released so that he can marry Laura.

Cast
 Brian Keith as District Attorney Jim Fremont
 Beverly Garland as Laura Barton
 Dick Foran as Arthur "Artie" Blane
 Douglas Kennedy as Ken Harrison
 Paul Langton as Police Capt. Jake Parker
 Elisha Cook, Jr. as Candymouth Duggan
 Gavin Gordon as Alan Dixon
 Beverly Tyler as Sylvia Clarkson
 Buddy Lewis as Kerry Jordan
 Anthony George as Duncan

See also
 List of American films of 1957

References

External links
 
 
 
 

1957 films
Film noir
1957 crime drama films
American crime drama films
American black-and-white films
1950s English-language films
Films about the labor movement
Films based on American novels
Films directed by Sidney Salkow
Films produced by Edward Small
Films scored by Emil Newman
Films set in Chicago
Films shot in Chicago
United Artists films
1950s American films